Two-9 is an American hip hop collective from the East side of Atlanta, Georgia. The collective currently houses Key!, Curtis Williams, Jace, CeeJ, Cartier Dave (f/k/a Dav E), Lightskin Mac11 and DJ Osh Kosh.  As well as the sub-groups Retro Su$h! (Jace & CeeJ) and FatKidsBrotha (Cartier Dave & Lightskin Mac11).

The group was founded by Williams and Key! in 2009. They are currently signed under Mike Will Made It's label EarDrummers Entertainment.

Music career

2012
The group released a mixtape Two-9 Forever in July 2012. Since that release, Two9 has been working constantly. They released A Two9 Christmas with DJ Don Cannon on Christmas Day 2012.
 They made ComplexMusic's list of "25 New Rappers to Watch Out For".

2013
Two-9 were part of the second "Trillectro Music Festival 2013" held in Washington with ASAP Ferg, Wale, Casey Veggies, Travis Scott and more.

Discography

Studio album
FRVR was released February 9, 2017, by Interscope and EarDrummers Entertainment, and is available on CD and digital download.

Mixtapes 
 Eastside Paradise (FatKidsBrotha) (2011)
 Trill Shit Only (Curtis Williams) (2011)
 Two-9 Forever (2012)
 A Two9 Christmas (2012)
 Kung Fu In Japan (Retro Sushi) (2012)
 Mothers Are The Blame (Key!) (2012)
 NOONEISREADY (Key! & TrapMoneyBenny) (2012)
 Half Forgotten Daydreams (Curtis Williams) (2013)
 Fathers Are The Curse (Key!) (2013)
 Eastside Paradise II (FatKidsBrotha) (2013)
 NOONEISREADY II (Key! & TrapMoneyBenny) (2014)
 Danco James (Curtis Williams) (2014)
 B4FRVR (2015)
 #AugustTwo9 EP (2015)
 #SeptemberTwo9 EP (2015)
 #OctoberTwo9 EP (2015)

Singles 
"Where The Money At? (prod. by Mike Will Made It)"
"Everything (prod. by Mike Will Made It)"
"3732 (Retro Sushi) ft. OJ Da Juiceman"
"Free Waffles (Retro Sushi & Key!)"
"Rackades" 
"By The Hour"

References

American hip hop groups
Hip hop collectives
Musical groups established in 2009
Southern hip hop groups
Alternative hip hop groups
Underground hip hop groups